Pseudophilautus fergusonianus, known as Ferguson's shrub frog is a species of frog in the family Rhacophoridae.
It is endemic to Sri Lanka.

Its natural habitats are subtropical or tropical moist lowland forests, subtropical or tropical moist montane forests, plantations, rural gardens, and heavily degraded former forest.

References

fergusonianus
Amphibians described in 1927
Frogs of Sri Lanka
Endemic fauna of Sri Lanka
Taxonomy articles created by Polbot